Karthäuserhof is the oldest winery in Rhineland-Palatinate state of Germany founded in 1335, when elector of Trier gave vineyards to Carthusians monks, after them is the winery name.

The only source of the fruit for winery is the local Karthäuserhofberg and vineyard of 19 hectares is planted mainly with Riesling grape.

References

External links 
Homepage in German
Facebook page

Wineries of Germany
Vineyards of Germany
Companies established in the 14th century
14th-century establishments in the Holy Roman Empire